Malin Jaya Gut (Lenzburg, Switzerland, 1 August 2000) is a Swiss professional footballer who most recently played as a midfielder for Swiss Women's Super League club Grasshopper. Malin Gut has currently got 14 caps for Switzerland. In August 2022, Gut announced that she would take a break from football for at least one season. She said that she lost joy in her life as a professional.

Club career
Gut played youth football with FC Fislisbach and FC Baden. At the age of 15, she started her professional career with FC Zürich. In July 2020, Gut signed for Arsenal. She made her Arsenal debut on 6 September 2020 when being subbed on for the last 15 minutes in their opening game versus Reading. On 28 January 2022, Gut completed a transfer to Grasshopper, following an ACL injury that sidelined her for the previous eight months.

International career 
Gut has been capped for the Switzerland national team, appearing for the team during the 2019 FIFA Women's World Cup qualification and the UEFA Women's Euro 2022 qualification.

Career statistics

With Arsenal 
As of 28 January 2022.

References

External links
 Malin Gut - International career
 
 

2000 births
Living people
Swiss women's footballers
Switzerland women's international footballers
Women's association football midfielders
Swiss expatriate sportspeople in England
FC Zürich Frauen players
Swiss Women's Super League players
Arsenal W.F.C. players
Grasshopper Club Zürich (women) players
Swiss expatriate footballers
Expatriate women's footballers in England